River Esporte Clube, commonly known as River, is a Brazilian football club based in Boa Vista, Roraima, Roraima state. They won the Campeonato Roraimense three times.

History
The club was founded on December 22, 1962. River won the Campeonato Roraimense in 1979, 1989, and in 1994.

Achievements

 Campeonato Roraimense:
 Winners (3): 1979, 1989, 1994

Stadium
River Esporte Clube play their home games at Estádio Flamarion Vasconcelos, nicknamed Canarinho. The stadium has a maximum capacity of 6,000 people.

References

Football clubs in Roraima
Association football clubs established in 1962
1962 establishments in Brazil